The 2007 Race of Champions took place on December 16 at the Wembley Stadium. Michael Schumacher and Sebastian Vettel of the German team beat Finland to the Nation's Cup, however Mattias Ekström of Sweden and the Scandinavian team won the Driver's Cup after beating Schumacher in the three-heat final.

The event itself was overshadowed by the recent death of former World Rally Champion Colin McRae who died in a helicopter accident on the 15 September. He was due to represent Scotland alongside David Coulthard. Colin's position was filled by his rally driver brother Alister McRae.

Participants

Cars
 Abarth Grande Punto S2000
 Aston Martin Vantage N24
 Ford Focus RS WRC
 ROC Car
 Solution F Prototype

Driver's Cup

Final

Nations Cup

Quarterfinals

Semifinals

Final

See also
Race of Champions

References

External links
2007 Race of Champions at Official Site

Race of Champions
Race of Champions
Race of Champions
Race of Champions
International sports competitions in London